Shalom Charly "Papi" Turgeman (פפי תורג'מן; born April 7, 1970) is an Israeli former basketball player. He played in the Israel Basketball Premier League and the Euroleague, and was Captain of the Israel national basketball team. In 1995 he was the Israel Premier League Assists Leader.

Basketball career
Turgeman is 6' 5" (1.94 metres) tall and weighs 190 pounds (86 kg), and played at the guard position. His hometown is Jerusalem, Israel.

He played in the Israel Basketball Premier League and the Euroleague. Turgeman played for a decade for Hapoel Jerusalem. In 1995 he was the Israel Premier League Assists Leader, with 6.5 per game.

Turgeman also played for the Israel national basketball team, and was its Team Captain. He played in the FIBA 1997 European Championship for Men, FIBA 1999 European Championship for Men, FIBA 2001 European Championship for Men, and FIBA 2003 European Championship for Men.

References 

1970 births
Living people
Israeli men's basketball players
Israeli Basketball Premier League players